A semantic loan is a process of borrowing semantic meaning (rather than lexical items) from another language, very similar to the formation of calques. In this case, however, the complete word in the borrowing language already exists; the change is that its meaning is extended to include another meaning its existing translation has in the lending language. Calques, loanwords and semantic loans are often grouped roughly under the phrase "borrowing". Semantic loans often occur when two languages are in close contact, and takes various forms. The source and target word may be cognates, which may or may not share any contemporary meaning in common; they may be an existing loan translation or parallel construction (compound of corresponding words); or they may be unrelated words that share an existing meaning.

Examples
A typical example is the French word , which means "mouse" (the animal).

Another example, in this case propelled by speakers of the source language, is the English word already. Yiddish speakers who also spoke English began using the English word already to express this additional sense in English, and this usage came to be adopted in the larger English-speaking community (as in Enough already or Would you hurry up already?)

Some examples arise from reborrowing. For example, English pioneer was borrowed from Middle French in the sense of "digger, foot soldier, pedestrian", then acquired the sense of "early colonist, innovator" in English, which was reborrowed into French.

One example is the German semantic loan . The English verb "to realise" has more than one meaning: it means both "to make something happen/come true" and "to become aware of something". The German verb  originally only meant the former: to make something real. However, German later borrowed the other meaning of "to realise" from English, and today, according to Duden, also means "to become aware of something" (this meaning is still considered by many to be an Anglicism). The word  itself already existed before the borrowing took place; the only thing borrowed was this second meaning. (Compare this with a calque, such as antibody, from the German , where the word "antibody" did not exist in English before it was borrowed.)

A similar example is the German semantic loan , which meant only to draw something across, before it took on the additional borrowed meaning of its literal English translation overdraw in the financial sense. Note that the first halves of the terms are cognate (/over), but the second halves are unrelated (/draw).

Semantic loans may be adopted by many different languages: Hebrew  , Russian  , Polish , Finnish , and Vietnamese  all originally meant "star" in the astronomical sense, and then went on to adopt the sememe "star", as in a famous entertainer, from English. In this case the words are unrelated (save for the Russian and Polish words), but share a base meaning, here extended metaphorically.

See also
Calque
List of calques
Semantics
Semantic change
Phono-semantic matching
Polysemy

Sources
Some of this article was translated from its equivalent German Wikipedia article of June 2007.

References

Semantics
Evolution of language